Felipe Tontini da Silveira (born 16 July 1995) is a Brazilian footballer who plays as an attacking midfielder for XV de Piracicaba, on loan from Coritiba.

Career
Born in Foz do Iguaçu, Paraná, Tontini began his career at Grêmio Foot-Ball Porto Alegrense. He was first included in a senior matchday squad on 1 November 2015, remaining an unused substitute in their 2–0 home win over Clube de Regatas do Flamengo in the Campeonato Brasileiro Série A; he made two further appearances on the bench that month.

On 10 February 2016, he made his senior debut in a 1–0 win at Veranópolis in the year's Campeonato Gaúcho, replacing Giuliano after 61 minutes.

On 12 January 2017, Tontini moved to Série B team Ceará on a season-long loan. In October 2017, he was recalled from Grêmio.

On 31 January 2018, Tontini moved on loan to Danish Superliga club FC Helsingør. At the end of the season, he returned to Grêmio. In February 2020, Tontini left Gremio and joined Caxias.

References

External links

1995 births
Living people
People from Foz do Iguaçu
Association football midfielders
Brazilian footballers
Brazilian expatriate footballers
Grêmio Foot-Ball Porto Alegrense players
Ceará Sporting Club players
Sociedade Esportiva e Recreativa Caxias do Sul players
Coritiba Foot Ball Club players
Esporte Clube XV de Novembro (Piracicaba) players
FC Helsingør players
Campeonato Brasileiro Série B players
Campeonato Brasileiro Série D players
Danish 1st Division players
Expatriate footballers in Brazil
Sportspeople from Paraná (state)